The Canyon Falls Bridge is a bridge located on US Highway 41 (US 41) over the Sturgeon River in L'Anse Township, Michigan. It was listed on the National Register of Historic Places in 1999.

History
During 1947–48, the Michigan State Highway Department (MSHD) contracted for the construction of eleven different trunkline bridges in the Upper Peninsula. Five of these bridges were required because of reconstruction to US 41. The Canyon Falls Bridge was designated Bridge No. B2 of 7-4-5 C2 by the MSHD. The steel arch bridge was designed by MSHD engineers and constructed for $116,389.42, plus an additional $58,200 for structural steel. The bridge was completed in the middle of 1948, and has remained in use in essentially unaltered condition since.

This bridge is significant because the steel arch design is relatively rare in the state, due largely to the fact that few river crossings afforded the required vertical distance. The Canyon Falls Bridge is a visually striking construction, representing the Highway Department's focus on aesthetics.

Description
The Canyon Falls Bridge is constructed of a two-hinged, girder-ribbed arch. The ribs rest on massive concrete pedestals.

The configuration of the bridge is highly simplified, with some minimal decoration on ancillary components. Guardrails have ornamental steel rails and balusters, and a decorative concrete pylon tops each arch pedestal. The appearance of the pylons and the profile of the arched ribs gives the bridge a distinctive Art Moderne look.

See also
 
 
 
 
 List of bridges on the National Register of Historic Places in Michigan
 National Register of Historic Places listings in Baraga County, Michigan

References

Road bridges on the National Register of Historic Places in Michigan
Bridges completed in 1948
Transportation in Baraga County, Michigan
Bridges of the United States Numbered Highway System
National Register of Historic Places in Baraga County, Michigan
U.S. Route 41
Open-spandrel deck arch bridges in the United States
Steel bridges in the United States
Girder bridges in the United States
Buildings and structures in Baraga County, Michigan